John Jude Palencar (born February 26, 1957) is an American illustrator and fine artist, who specializes in works of fantasy, science fiction, and horror. In 2010, he was given the Hamilton King Award. His highly detailed work is described as containing a rich language of symbols and archetypes, which are left open to interpretation by the viewer.

Early life 
Palencar was born in Fairview Park, Ohio. He developed an interest in the subject matter of horror and science fiction early in life; dressing up as an alien with a homemade custom latex masks and exhibiting a fascination in both scaring others and being scared himself. In the third grade, his family would move to  Middleburg Heights, Ohio. He would win his first award in art in fifth grade with a three-colour block print for the Cleveland’s Plain Dealer newspaper calendar contest. He went on to attended Midpark High School. It was in high school that the artist came under the art training of Frederick C. Graff, who up until today is a established award winning artist, primarily in watercolor. After winning numerous art awards and selling a few paintings in high school, Palencar decided to pursue a career in art. He attended the Columbus College of Art and Design (CCAD) on scholarship, receiving a BFA degree in 1980. During his college years he worked for the  American Greetings Card Company and freelanced, establishing a list of regional and national clients in editorial, advertising and corporate art. As a senior at CCAD he won the top cash award at the Society of Illustrators Student Exhibition and was also presented with a scholarship to the Illustrators Workshop held in Paris, France.

Illustration career 
While still in college at Columbus College of Art and Design, Palencar exhibited work at the Society of Illustrators and the work on display attracted the attention of Byron Preiss. The result would be an early and prominent assignment for the artist in 1982 with the commission to illustrate The Secret, a puzzle book produced by Byron Preiss and published by Bantam Books. The illustrations for the book depict the visual components of 12 puzzles, each of which lead the reader on a treasure hunt. Preiss had hidden ceramic boxes, each redeemable for a jewel, in twelve cities and to date only three of the puzzles have been solved and the jewels recovered.

Palencar's first introduction to illustrating for fantasy and speculative fiction came shortly after college when working for Time-Life Books on The Enchanted World Series. The young artist would contribute to many books in the series, including Legends of Valor(1984), Ghosts(1984) and Night Creatures (1985).

His work has since appeared on hundreds of book covers for just about every major publisher in the U.S., and in over thirty countries around the world. The artist has created cover art for such authors as H. P. Lovecraft, Ursula Le Guin, Marion Zimmer Bradley, P.D. James, Charles de Lint, R.L. Stine, Octavia Butler, David Brin and Stephen King. New York Times Best Selling author, Christopher Paolini, a fan of John's work, named the lead character's birthplace "Palancar Valley", after John in his NY Times Bestseller, Eragon for which John also painted the cover, as well as creating the type treatment that would be used for the remaining three books in the series. Stephen King owns three works by the artist from the Dark Tower series.

Palancar has also created editorial illustrations for Time Magazine, Smithsonian Magazine, National Geographic, and Nat. Geo. Television as well as worked on entertainment projects for Lucas Arts, Paramount Pictures, and Vivendi Universal.

In 2004, Palencar became the Artist in Residence at the  Cill Rialaig Arts Centre, in County Kerry Ireland.

In 2007, Underwood Books would publish Origins:The Art of John Jude Palencar, a 128 page tribute to the artists work up until that time with a foreword by Christopher Paolini

In 2008, Palencar was awarded the Spectrum Award for Grand Master, which is an annual award presented to an artist who has worked for at least twenty years at a consistently high level of quality and has left his or her mark on the field of contemporary science fiction, fantasy and horror artwork.

In 2012, Tor Books editor David Hartwell was passing by the Tor art department and noticed a painting by Palancar leaning against the wall, Hartwell asked art director Irene Gallo what the painting was for and was told that the work had no specific commission. Hartwell used the work to initiate The Palencar Project, in which five writers, L.E. Modesitt, Jr, Gene Wolf, Michael Swanwick, Gregory Benford and James Morrow all wrote short stories based on the painting. The same painting would later be used as the cover for The One-Eyed Man by L. E. Modesitt Jr.

The George R.R. Martin 2019 A Song of Ice and Fire wall calendar would be illustrated by Palencar.

Working process 
Initial ideas are sketched quickly, to provide an art director with a general idea of how a finished work might appear. Once an approval for an idea is in hand, the artist creates a detailed rendering in pencil with subtle shading on a plate finish board. The final Palencar paintings are executed in acrylic, but in a watercolor fashion, in which initial thin layers are laid down as a wash first. Multiple layers and subtle colors are then woven together and then the artists begins to introduce opaque and semi opaque washes. Working in this manner borrows technical approaches from oil, watercolor and egg tempera mediums.

Personal life 
Palencar lives in Medina Township, Ohio with his wife Lee who is an art teacher at Highland High School in Medina. The couple have two boys, Ian and Kit. Kit, also an artist teaches drawing and painting at the University of Akron. Palencar maintains a personal collection of skulls and articulated skeletons that serve as inspiration and reference for many paintings.

Bibliography

Exhibitions 
Palencar has exhibited in numerous group shows in galleries, colleges and universities throughout the United States.

Solo 
Between Worlds, Canton Museum of Art, 2019
Images of Ireland, National Museum, Dublin
University of the Arts, Richard C. von Hess Gallery, 2008

Group 
La Mars Art Center, Exhibition of the American Watercolor Society, 2020 
Society of Illustrators, Masters of The Fantastic, 2019
Schomburg Center for Research in Black Culture, Unveiling Visions: The Alchemy of the Black Imagination, curated by John Jennings and Reynaldo Anderson, 2015
Kosart Studios & Gallery, Maleficium: Dark Art Exhibition, 2015 
Butler Institute of American Art, 2013 
Allentown Art Museum, At the Edge: Art of the Fantastic,curated by Patrick and Jeannie Wilshire, 2012
Nucleus Gallery, At the Mountains of Madness:A Tribute to the Writings of Lovecraft, 2010

Awards 

Gold Medal, American Water Color Society, for The Dark Line, 2020
 Gold Medal (Institutional), Spectrum 27, 2020, for The Stranger: The Seventh Faith 
 Silver Medal (Institutional), Spectrum 26, 2019, for The Nights Watch
 Hamilton King Award, Society of Illustrators, 2010, for cover of Muse and Reverie by Charles de Lint
Gold Medal, Society of Illustrators, 2010
 Spectrum Grand Master Award, 2008
 Gold Medal (book), Spectrum Awards 1996, for Blood Debt
Gold Medal (book), Spectrum Awards 1995, for Becoming Human
 Chesley Awards Winner 2006, 2001, 2000, 1999, 1995

References

External links 

1957 births
Living people
American speculative fiction artists
People from Fairview Park, Ohio
American illustrators
20th-century American painters
American male painters
21st-century American painters
Fantasy artists
Horror artists
Artists from Ohio
Science fiction artists
Columbus College of Art and Design alumni
20th-century American male artists